HD 187923 is a suspected variable star in the equatorial constellation of Aquila. It is a dim star that is just visible to the naked eye, having an apparent visual magnitude of 6.148. The star is moving closer to the Earth with a heliocentric radial velocity of −20.7 km/s.

This is an ordinary G-type main-sequence star with a stellar classification of G0 V. It has some similarities to the Sun, and thus is considered a solar analog. Brewer et al. (2016) estimate the star has 1.3 times the mass of the Sun and 1.44 times the Sun's radius. It is thought to be around 9 billion years old and is spinning slowly with a projected rotational velocity of 0.1 km/s. The star is radiating double the Sun's luminosity from its photosphere at an effective temperature of 5,774 K. Casagrande et al. (2011) gave a much lower mass estimate of 1.02 times the Sun's mass with an age of around 10.2 billion years.

References

External links
 HR 7569
 Image HD 187923

G-type main-sequence stars
Suspected variables
Aquila (constellation)
Durchmusterung objects
4126
187923
097667
7569